The 2012 OEC Kaohsiung was a professional tennis tournament played on hard courts. It was the first edition of the tournament which was part of the 2012 ATP Challenger Tour. It took place in Kaohsiung, Taiwan between 23 and 29 April 2012.

Singles main-draw entrants

Seeds

 1 Rankings are as of April 16, 2012.

Other entrants
The following players received wildcards into the singles main draw:
  Huang Liang-chi
  Lee Hsin-han
  Wang Chieh-fu
  Yi Chu-huan

The following players received entry from the qualifying draw:
  Victor Baluda
  Mirza Bašić
  Daniel King-Turner
  Ouyang Bowen

The following players received entry from the qualifying draw as a lucky loser:
  Yasutaka Uchiyama

Champions

Singles

 Go Soeda def.  Tatsuma Ito, 6–3, 6–0

Doubles

 John Paul Fruttero /  Raven Klaasen def.  Hsieh Cheng-peng /  Lee Hsin-han, 6–7(6–8), 7–5, [10–8]

References

External links
Official Website

OEC Kaohsiung
OEC Kaohsiung
2012 in Taiwanese tennis